Euroswydd is a figure in Welsh mythology, the father of Nisien and Efnysien by Penarddun, daughter of Beli Mawr. In the Second Branch of the Mabinogi Penarddun is the wife of Llŷr, by whom her children are Brân, Branwen, and Manawydan. The circumstances of Nisien and Efnysien's conception are not described, but one of the Welsh Triads mentions that Euroswydd had held Llŷr captive as one of the Three Exalted Prisoners of the Island of Britain; it is likely the traditions are connected.

References
Rachel Bromwich (editor and translator), Trioedd Ynys Prydein: The Welsh Triads, Cardiff: University of Wales Press, 1978.  
Jeffrey Gantz (translator), The Mabinogion, London and New York: Penguin Books, 1976. 
Ifans, Dafydd & Rhiannon, Y Mabinogion (Gomer 1980) 

Welsh mythology